Ozurgeti Drama Theatre is a theater in Ozurgeti, Georgia.

References 

Theatres in Georgia (country)
Ozurgeti
Buildings and structures in Guria
Tourist attractions in Guria